Les Misérables is a 1982 French drama film directed by Robert Hossein. It is one of the numerous screen adaptations of the 1862 novel of the same name by Victor Hugo. It was entered into the 13th Moscow International Film Festival where it won a Special Prize.

Plot summary

Cast

 Lino Ventura as Jean Valjean
 Michel Bouquet as Inspecteur Javert
 Évelyne Bouix as Fantine
 Christiane Jean as Cosette
 Valentine Bordelet as Cosette (child)
 Jean Carmet as Thénardier
 Françoise Seigner as La Thénardier
 Frank David as Marius
 Candice Patou as Éponine
 Agathe Ladner as Éponine (child)
 Emmanuel Curtil as Gavroche
 Hervé Furic as Enjolras (as Hervé Fulric)
 Louis Seigner as  Monseigneur Myriel
 Fernand Ledoux as Gillenormand
 Paul Préboist as Fauchelevent
 Corinne Dacla as Azelma
 Catherine Di Rigo as Azelma (child) (as Kathleen Di Rigo)
 Robin Renucci as Courfeyrac
 Christian Benedetti as Combeferre (as Christian Bénédetti)
 Tony Joudrier as  Bossuet
 Christophe Odent as Bahorel
 Alexandre Tamar as Grantaire
 Roger Hanin as L'aubergiste
 Nathalie Nerval as La fille Gillenormand
 Martine Pascal as La mère supérieure
 Aline Bertrand as Mme Magloire
 Madeleine Bouchez as Mlle Baptistine
 Viviane Elbaz as Soeur Simplice
 Dominique Davray as La Magnon
 Claude Lancelot as Bamatabois
 Denis Lavant as Montparnasse
 Jean-René Gossart as Claquesous (as Jean-René Gossard)
 Jacques Blal as Petit Gervais
 Dominique Zardi as Chenildieu

Differences from the novel
 The film starts with Valjean's release from prison, which is followed by the opening credits and then jumps to the presentation of the bishop, which is at beginning of the novel.
 Javert is shown (though not named) in the opening scene; the book introduces him in Montreuil.
 Fantine is introduced in Montreuil; her former life in Paris is left out.
Fantine dies of her illness before Javert arrives to arrest Valjean. In the book, it is the shock of realizing that Cosette did not arrive, and Javert telling her Valjean's real identity, that kills her.
 Valjean is not sent back to the galleys; he manages to escape Javert after Fantine's death.
 Valjean's escape from the convent in a coffin is cut out.
 Valjean dies alone, making his death even more tragic. 
 The last scene is a flashback to Valjean's release from prison, with a minor change in dialogue. The first time, Javert says, "You are free," and the second time, the line is, "Now, you are free."

Minor sub-plots
 Valjean's arrival in Digne is lengthily depicted; we even see him going into the town hall to have his passport signed.
 Petit-Gervais is included.
 We see Valjean lifting the cart off Fauchelevent, and we also learn that he sent him to the convent in Paris afterwards.
 One of the few adaptions that does not change the names of the three convicts who recognize Valjean (Brevet, Chenildieu and Cochepaille), and in which Valjean proves his identity in the same way as he does in the book.
 Valjean leaves the convent for the same reason as he does in the book.
 The attack in the House Gorbeau is included, and takes place in nearly exactly the same way as it does in the book.
 The romance between Marius and Cosette takes place in nearly the same way as in the book.
 Javert's letter to the Prefect is read aloud by Javert as we see him taking the coach towards the bridge.
 Valjean confesses his true identity to Marius after the wedding and dies of grief at the end.
 Most dialogue is taken word for word from the book.
 While some scenes are anachronistic (e.g. the prison), the overall impression is a very dark and sinister one, fitting the book very well.

Notes
 Robert Hossein also directed the original 1980 Paris production of the musical: this film and the musical are the only adaptations where Fantine dies before Javert's arrival; the falling of the barricade is depicted in very slow motion as it is in the musical and Gavroche's song "C'est la faute à..." is sung to the same melody in this film as it is in the musical.
 The actor who plays Chenildieu in this adaption plays Cochepaille in the 2000 miniseries.

Awards

César Awards (1983)
 Best Supporting Actor (Jean Carmet, won)
 Nominated :
 Best Actor (Lino Ventura)
 Best Adaptation (Robert Hossein)
 Best Cinematography (Edmond Richard)
 Best Production Design (François de Lamothe)

Moscow Film Festival (1983)
 Special prize, for the contribution to the cinema (Robert Hossein)

See also
 Adaptations of Les Misérables

References

External links
 
 
 Review by film historian Tim Brayton

1982 films
1982 drama films
French drama films
1980s French-language films
Films based on Les Misérables
Films featuring a Best Supporting Actor César Award-winning performance
1980s French films